The Blackburn B.26 Botha was a four-seat reconnaissance and torpedo bomber. It was produced by the British aviation company Blackburn Aircraft at its factories at Brough and Dumbarton.

The Botha was developed during the mid 1930s in response to Air Ministry Specification M.15/35, and was ordered straight off the drawing board alongside the competing Bristol Beaufort. On 28 December 1938, the first production aircraft made the type's maiden flight; almost exactly one year later, it enter service with the RAF. During official evaluation testing of the Botha, stability issues were revealed, as well as the fact that it was underpowered. It was only briefly used in frontline operations before being withdrawn to secondary roles during 1941. It continued to be flown in secondary roles, largely being used for training and as a target tug, before the Botha was fully withdrawn during September 1944.

Development
During September 1935, the British Air Ministry issued specification M.15/35, which called for a new reconnaissance/torpedo bomber to reequip RAF Coastal Command. Amongst the stipulations set out were for the use of a twin-engined arrangement, a crew of three, and the provision of internal stowage to accommodate a single torpedo. Blackburn opted to produce a design to meet this requirement. During early 1936, two submissions that fulfilled this requirement were accepted, one being Blackburn's and the other being the Type 152 from Bristol. The Blackburn design would receive the name Botha after General Botha, while the rival Type 152 would be named  Beaufort after the Duke of Beaufort.

Both of the proposed aircraft were originally intended to be powered by the Bristol Perseus radial engine, capable of producing 850 hp (634 kW). At a late stage, the  Air Ministry decided to revise the specification and reissue it as M.10/36; the principal change was that the aircraft was abruptly required to accommodate a crew of four, along with an enlarged fuselage that increased the aircraft's overall weight. It was also intended that this change would allow the successful design to be ordered straight from the drawing board. A consequence of the weight increase was that both designs suddenly required more power to be able to achieve their envisioned performance; however, while the Taurus, capable of producing up to 1,130 hp (840 kW), was provided for the Beaufort, the Botha only received the Perseus X, capable of up to 880 hp (660 kW), due to limited supplies of the Taurus engine.

Early on, Blackburn made several proposals to address the engine shortfall; the adoption of the large Bristol Hercules radial engine was the main element of the proposed Botha II, however, it was not pursued. During December 1936, the Air Ministry ordered 442 Bothas, it placed orders for the competing Beaufort as well. Immediately upon receipt of the order, Blackburn set about establishing two production lines for the Botha at its main factory at Brough and its new facility in Dumbarton, Scotland; additional component manufacturing was performed at the Olympia works in Leeds.

On 28 December 1938, the first flight of the Botha took place at Brough , piloted by H. Bailey. This was  the first production aircraft, since there was no prototypes as such. On 25 March 1939 it was delivered to RAF Martlesham Heath for performance and handling trials by the Aeroplane and Armament Experimental Establishment (A&AEE). The first production aircraft was found to have inadequate elevator control; this was  rectified on a second aircraft sent for trials by a slight increase in the tailplane area and a larger horn-balanced elevator.

A total of 300 aircraft were produced at Brough, while another 200 Bothas were constructed at Dumbarton for a total of 580. Peak production was attained in June 1940, during that month alone the two sites produced 58 aircraft. Limited modifications were implemented during the production run, such as the addition of a jettisonable main entrance door, non-retractable bulged navigator windows, new flap jacks, and an improved undercarriage retraction mechanism; several proposed changes, such as larger propellers and flame dampers, were not implemented.

Design
In terms of its basic configuration, the Blackburn Botha was a twin-engined cantilever monoplane; the high-mounted wing was a deliberate design decision as to provide the best possible downwards view for its occupants. The pilot, which was seated in a relatively spacious and well-instrumented cabin at the front of the aircraft, had an exceptionally unobstructed forward-facing field of view, although the rearwards view was impinged upon by the placement of the engines. The navigator and wireless operator's positions were within a separate central cabin reached via an entrance door with a built-in stepladder on the starboard side of the fuselage. Crewmembers could move between their positions via a narrow gangway; the observer had to use this same passage to reach the prone bombing position in the aircraft's nose. The final crew member, the gunner, was positioned to the rear of the wing in an egg-shaped power-assisted turret on the upper fuselage.

The forward fuselage was largely reminiscent of the Blackburn Skua, and had a flush-rivetted Alclad plated covering, while the rear portion of the fuselage was a metal skin over a tubular metal structure. Flight surfaces such as the rudder, elevator, and ailerons had fabric coverings. The center section of the wing housed the aircraft's three main fuel tanks, which normally had a combined maximum capacity of 435.75 gallons, but could be raised to 565.75 gallons for special operations. Hydraulically-actuated split flaps were present on the central section of the wing's trailing edge, while the balanced ailerons were fitted on the sharply-tapered outer wing panels. Both the fin and tailplane were unbraced cantilevers with stressed-skin construction.

The undercarriage consisted of two oleo-pneumatic legs that retracted rearwards into the nacelles, which were fitted with spring-loaded doors; hand-operated hydraulic brakes were fitted. As built, the Botha I was powered by a pair of Bristol Perseus X radial engines, which each drove a de Havilland Type 5/11 Hydromatic three-bladed constant-speed propeller. The engines, which were mounted onto the central section of the wing in wide-chord cowlings, were fitted with controllable cooling grills. There was a special cell in the fuselage could accommodate a single torpedo, a single 500lb bomb, or two 250lb bombs; additional bombs could be fitted on external bomb racks on the mainplane. Other armaments included the pilot's forward-firing .303-inch Vickers machine gun and the twin Lewis guns installed in the turret. Comprehensive marine gear, including a collapsible dingy, was also provided.

Operational history

On 12 December 1939, the RAF received its first Botha, which was delivered to No. 5 Maintenance Unit at RAF Kemble, Gloucestershire. Service testing of the Botha was marred by a series of accidents, although no common cause was ever disclosed according to the aviation author Aubrey Joseph Jackson, nor did he consider the loss rate to be excessive for the era. However, the aircraft was commonly considered to be somewhat underpowered.

According to aviation author Roger Haywood, concerns were raised regarding its poor lateral stability, while the crew's view to the side or rearward was virtually nonexistent owing to the positioning of the aircraft's engines, the poor view making the aircraft "useless as a GR [General Reconnaissance] aircraft". Although the Botha passed torpedo and mine-dropping tests, the aircraft's poor general performance resulted in the decision in April 1940 to issue the Botha only to four general reconnaissance squadrons equipped with the Avro Anson, rather than the torpedo bomber squadrons previously planned.

During June 1940, the Botha entered squadron service with No. 608 Squadron. Two months later, it started conducting convoy escort duties, although No. 608 Squadron would be the only squadron to conduct operational deployments with the type. While flying these patrols, the typical bomb load carried was three  anti-submarine bombs along with two  general-purpose bombs. According to Jackson, operational need for aircraft such as the Botha had greatly diminished following the Fall of France that year.

Efforts aimed at addressing some of the aircraft's shortcomings led to both the airframe and engines being subject to further development work. However, the Air Staff decided to withdraw the Botha from frontline service and transfer the surviving aircraft to secondary duties. Accordingly, numerous training units received the type; at one point in 1941, the one unit had over a hundred Bothas amongst its inventory. However, the combination of inexperienced pilots and its unfavourable flight characteristics resulted in further casualties being incurred. Some Bothas were converted to target tugs, such aircraft were redesignated as TT Mk.I. In August 1943, the type was officially declared to be obsolete, with many aircraft being broken up either onsite or after their return to Blackburn. During September 1944, the Botha was fully retired from RAF service.

Variants
 Botha Mk I : Four-seat reconnaissance, torpedo bomber aircraft.
 Botha TT Mk I : Target tug aircraft.

Operators

 Polish Air Force
 No. 301 Polish Bomber Squadron
 No. 304 Polish Bomber Squadron

 Royal Air Force
 No. 3 School of General Reconnaissance
 No. 24 Squadron
 No. 502 Squadron
 No. 608 Squadron

Specifications (Botha Mk.I - Perseus XA)

See also

References

Citations

Bibliography

External links

 Rickard, J (2 November 2008) Blackburn Botha

Botha
1930s British bomber aircraft
High-wing aircraft
History of West Dunbartonshire
Aircraft first flown in 1938
Twin piston-engined tractor aircraft